The PZL-Mielec M-20 Mewa (Polish: Gull) is a licence-built version of the Piper PA-34 Seneca II manufactured in Poland by WSK PZL Mielec in a limited series from the 1980s.

Development
A licence to build the PA-34-200T was purchased in 1978, when WSK-Mielec started to co-operate with Western manufacturers. The Polish aircraft were to be fitted with  PZL-Franklin F6A-350 engines. The first Mewa, partly assembled from US-delivered parts, flew on 25 July 1979. However, the Polish communist authorities were reluctant to produce civil aircraft of this class as there was no civil aircraft free market in Poland at that time. As a result, the second prototype, built in Poland, was not flown until 1982 and the third M-20 02, being the basis for serial production, on10 October 10, 1985. In 1988, an air ambulance version M-20 03 was developed, with Teledyne Continental TSIO/LTSIO-360-KB engines.

After 1990 production of the Mewa commenced for the civilian market. Despite the fact that it won the Teraz Polska award in 1993, interest was very limited and only 33 had been built by the end of 1998.

In April 2015, Aero AT (Jiangsu) Aviation Industrial bought the intellectual property for the M-20 Mewa from U.S.-based Sikorsky Aircraft's subsidiary PZL Mielec in Poland. Poland-based Aero AT Ltd., Jiangsu Aero AT Aviation Technologies and Changzhou National Hi-Tech District entered into an investment agreement on 30 October 2015. The plan being for Jiangsu Aero to assemble the M-20 Mewa in China at the Changzhou Konggang Industrial Park. The first Chinese produced M-20 Mewa was expected to roll off the production line at the facility in 2017, followed by 50 aircraft annually starting in 2018.

Operational history
Four M-20s were used by the Polish Air Ambulance Service. As of 2006, there were still 14 M-20s on the Polish civilian registry. One is used by the Polish Border Guard.

Operators

Lotnicze Pogotowie Ratunkowe (Polish: Air Ambulance Service) operated 4 aircraft till 2009. They were replaced by two Piaggio P.180 Avanti.
Polish Border Guard received 1 aircraft.

Specifications (PZL M-20 Mewa)

See also

References

Further reading

External links

Poser page 
Photo gallery at Lotnictwo.net

1970s Polish civil utility aircraft
M20
Low-wing aircraft
Aircraft first flown in 1979
Twin piston-engined tractor aircraft